Nengi Omuku (born 1987) is a Nigerian creative artist, sculptor and painter.

Early life and education 
Born in Asaba, Delta State, Nigeria. Omuku studied both her B.A. and M.A in Fine art at the Slade School of Fine Art, University College London.

Notable works 

 I can't feel my legs, March 2012, oil on canvas, 220 x 160 cm.
 Botticelli, April 2012, oil on canvas, 100 x 140 cm.
 Corkscrew October 2014.
 Room with a view, 2020, oil on sanyan 130 x 190 cm
 What was lost, 2020, oil on sanyan 208 x 243 cm

Awards 
Nengi Omuku's artistic work has won her scholarships and awards, including the British Council CHOGM art award presented by Her majesty Queen Elizabeth II.

 2012 Prankerd Jones Memorial Prize Awarded by University College London
 2011 Nancy Balfour MA Scholarship Awarded by University College London
 2003 Winner- British Council CHOGM art competition Awarded by Queen Elisabeth II

Exhibitions

Solo exhibitions 

 Kristin Hjellegjerde Gallery, Berlin (2021)
 Gathering, Kristin Hjellegjerde Gallery, London (2020)
 Stages of Collapse, September Gray, Atlanta (2017)
 A State of Mind, The Armory Show, New York (2016)
 A State of Mind, Omenka Gallery, Lagos (2015)
 To Figure an Encounter, Open The Gate, London (2011).

Group exhibitions 

 La Galerie, Contemporary art Center, Noisy-le-Sec (2021)
 All the Days and Nights, Kristin Hjellegjerde Gallery, London (2020)
 Untitled Art San Francisco, with Kristin Hjellegjerde Gallery, San Francisco (2020)
 1-54 Contemporary African Art Fair, London (2019), Hospital Rooms, Griffin Gallery, London (2018)
 At work, Arthouse, Lagos (2018); ARTX,Lagos (2017)
 Commotion, 1:54, London (2017); Mapping Histories, Constructing Realities, ART15, London (2015)
 The Next 50 Years, Omenka Gallery, Lagos (2014)
 Jerwood Drawing Prize Exhibition, Jerwood Gallery, London (2012).
 Deep Cuts Last Measures, Stephen Lawrence Gallery, London (2011)
 Surplus to Requirements, Slade Research Center, London (2011)
 The Future of Contemporary Art, Lloyd Gill Gallery, Bristol (2010)
 Group Exhibition, Swiss Cottage Gallery, London (2010)
 Group Exhibition, Camden Art Gallery, London (2009)

Commissions 

 Arts Council England to paint a mural in an intensive care psychiatric ward in Maudsley hospital, London (2018)
 HSBC Art Collection,
 Beth Rudin DeWoody Collection
 Dawn Art Collection

References 

21st-century Nigerian artists
Nigerian painters
People from Delta State
Living people
1987 births